Exeed College is a business school and Higher Education institution based out of Sharjah, United Arab Emirates.

External links

 Exeed College

Universities and colleges in the United Arab Emirates
 Educational institutions established in 2007
Universities and colleges in Sharjah (city)
schools
United Arab Emirates
Universities and colleges in Dubai
Distance education institutions based in the United Arab Emirates
2007 establishments in the United Arab Emirates